Planitero  (Greek: Πλανητέρο) is a mountain village in the municipal unit of Kleitoria, Achaea, Greece. It is situated in the southwestern part of the Chelmos (Aroania) mountains. Its population is 197 people (2011 census). Its elevation is 700 m. Planiteri is 1.5 km north of Armpounas, 6 km northeast of Kleitoria and 12 km southeast of Kalavryta. The source of the river 
Aroanios is near Planitero.

Population

See also

List of settlements in Achaea
http://www.ekalavrita.gr/EN/planitero.html

External links
Planitero at the GTP Travel Pages

Populated places in Achaea